Agononida ocyrhoe is a species of squat lobster in the family Munididae. The specific name is from "Ocyrhoe," one of the Oceanids in Greek mythology.

References

Squat lobsters
Crustaceans described in 1994